Pierre-A. Brouillette (born May 24, 1951 in Saint-Séverin, Mauricie) was a politician in Quebec, Canada. He is a businessman.

Brouillette was elected as a Liberal candidate to the provincial legislature in the district of Champlain in 1985.  He was re-elected in 1989, but was defeated by PQ candidate Yves Beaumier in 1994.

He tried to return in the 2003 election (on April 14), but the election resulted in a tie vote.  A subsequent by-election was held on May 20 to break the tie, and it gave PQ candidate Noëlla Champagne the victory over Brouillette by 642 votes.

References

1951 births
Living people
Quebec Liberal Party MNAs